"Nasty Girl" is a song written and composed by American musician Prince. The song was first recorded by his protégée girl group Vanity 6 in 1982, who charted at number one on the US Hot Dance Club Play chart with their version. Prince gave the songwriting credit to lead singer Vanity, although he was the writer and composer. Inaya Day recorded a hit cover version of the song in 2004 that reached number 9 in the UK Singles Chart. There have also been several other versions of this song.

Background
"Nasty Girl" was originally recorded by Vanity 6 on the Warner Bros. Records label for their self-titled debut studio album Vanity 6. The song was produced by Prince and issued as the album's second single on September 24, 1982. Due to its explicit lyrics, "Nasty Girl" met with resistance on mainstream American radio, peaking within the US Bubbling Under Hot 100 Singles chart. It did, however, become a sizable hit on US R&B radio and it hit number one on the US Hot Dance Club Play chart for four weeks in November 1982. The song was knocked off the number one position by Prince's own "1999."

The lyrics's explicit content ultimately ends in a let-down for the woman from whose perspective they are written, concluding with the disappointed recitation, "Oh, is that it? / Hmph--wake me when you're done. / I guess you'll be the only one having fun."

"Nasty Girl" reached number 7 on the Dutch singles chart in November 1982, and number 11 on the Belgian (Flanders) chart in December 1982. Lead singer Vanity, who later became a Christian preacher, subsequently denounced the song and told members of her congregation who listened to the song to "keep praying for the Holy Spirit".

Billboard named the song number 37 on their list of 100 Greatest Girl Group Songs of All Time.

Track listing
US 7-inch
 "Nasty Girl" (2:55)
 "Drive Me Wild" (2:30)

Charts

Weekly charts

Year-end charts

Inaya Day version

Background
American singer Inaya Day recorded a cover version of "Nasty Girl" and released it as a single in 2004. This version peaked at number 18 in Australia in February 2005, remaining on the chart for 11 weeks. It was released in the United Kingdom and Ireland later the same year, reaching number nine on the UK Singles Chart and number 42 on the Irish Singles Chart. The cover was also successful in American dance clubs, peaking at number five on the Billboard Hot Dance Club Play chart.

Track listings
 "Nasty Girl" (Ivan Gough radio edit)
 "Nasty Girl" (Mousse T & So Phat club mix)
 "Nasty Girl" (John Course & Mr Timothy ReRub)
 "Nasty Girl" (Luke Bowditch Mix)
 "Nasty Girl" (Phuture Grooves: Ajax & Damon Boyd Mix)
 "Nasty Girl" (Wei-Shen & Marcos Mix)

Charts

Weekly charts

Year-end charts

See also
 List of number-one dance hits (United States)

References

Vanity 6 songs
1982 singles
1982 songs
2004 singles
Song recordings produced by Prince (musician)
Songs written by Prince (musician)
Warner Records singles